Áine Maeve Kelly-Costello (born 30 March 1995) is a New Zealand climate justice and disability rights campaigner and journalist, and musician. She competed in the London 2012 Paralympic Games in swimming, becoming New Zealand Paralympian #180.

Early life
Kelly-Costello attended Pinehurst School in Auckland, New Zealand. Her school nominated her for the 2012 Sir George Elliot Scholarship and she was one of the three successful applicants; scholarship recipients are chosen for their academic ability and having experienced a challenging background.

Para swimming career 
Kelly-Costello competed in Para swimming as a teenager. She won four gold medals at the 2009 Australian Paralympic Youth Games in Melbourne, VIC, Australia. Kelly-Costello is blind and competed in the S11 sports class. She has a rare recessive genetic disorder known as Liber's congenital amaurosis. 

She was selected to the New Zealand team for the London 2012 Paralympic Games. She competed in four freestyle and backstroke events.

Kelly-Costello retired from Para swimming following London 2012 aged 17 to focus on her passion for music.

Career as a climate justice and disability advocate 
Kelly-Costello worked as a community organiser for the Access Matters campaign for accessibility law.

In 2021, she completed a Masters in Investigative Journalism from Gothenburg University, conducting for her thesis a qualitative analysis on the practice of climate change journalism. This work has been featured in The Conversation. Her writing on climate justice and disability rights has also appeared in other prominent media outlets.

She hosts and produces Disability Crosses Borders, an independent podcast and blog featuring conversations where disability, migration and culture meet.

Passion for music 
As a musician, Kelly-Costello plays a variety of instruments, and has led the New Zealand Symphony Orchestra in concert.

References

New Zealand activists
Swimmers at the 2012 Summer Paralympics
New Zealand musicians
New Zealand bloggers
Living people
1995 births
New Zealand female swimmers
Paralympic swimmers of New Zealand
People educated at Pinehurst School